A folie à deux (French for "the madness of two") is a rare psychiatric syndrome shared by two people.

Folie à deux may also refer to:

Literature
 "Folie à Deux" (short story), a story by Anirudh Kala from the 2018 anthology The Unsafe Asylum
 "Folie à Deux" (poem), a poem by Jill Alexander Essbaum from the 2007 poetry book Harlot (poetry collection)
 "Folie a Deux" (book), a 2013 autobiography by Robert Eringer

Music
Folie à Deux (album), a 2008 album by Fall Out Boy
Folie à Deux: The Elements & The Madness (album), a 2008 album by Prospero (band)
"Folie a Deux" (song), a 2005 song by Sezen Aksu off the album Excuse; see Sezen Aksu discography
"Folie a Deux" (song), a chamber music composition by Emily Doolittle

Stage and screen
"Folie à Deux" (Chicago Med), a 2018 season 3 episode 11 of Chicago Med
"Folie à Deux" (Elementary), a 2016 season 5 episode 1 of Elementary
"Folie a Deux" (Law & Order: Criminal Intent), a Law & Order: Criminal Intent season 8 episode
"Folie à Deux" (The X-Files), a 1998 episode of The X-Files
Joker: Folie à Deux, a DC Comics feature film project sequel to Joker 2019
 Folie a Deux (play), a 1995 stage play by Stephanie Johnson (author)

Other uses
Folie à Deux (winery), a Napa Valley, California, USA, winery
 Folie à Deux (exhibition), a 2018 art exhibition by Felix Bernstein & Gabe Rubin

See also

 
 Folie (disambiguation)
 Deux (disambiguation)